Vasant Naisadrai Raiji (26 January 1920 – 13 June 2020) was an Indian first-class cricketer and cricket historian. He featured in nine first class matches between 1939 and 1950.

Life and career
Raiji was born in Baroda. Representing a Cricket Club of India team on his first-class debut in a festival match in 1939, he scored a duck in the first innings and just a single run in the second. In 1941-42 he opened the batting for Bombay in the Ranji Trophy, and was a reserve for the Hindus team in the 1941 Bombay Pentangular. He then moved to play for Baroda, and his two highest scores came in Baroda's victory over Maharashtra in the 1944-45 Ranji Trophy, when he made 68 and 53. His younger brother Madan also played first-class cricket for Bombay in the 1940s.

At the end of Raiji's playing career, he turned to writing, and wrote several important works on early Indian cricket. He was an accountant by profession and authored two books on the subject. In the 1930s he was one of the founding members of the Jolly Cricket Club in Bombay along with his friend Anandji Dossa, who was a renowned cricket statistician. 

Towards the end of his life he lived in the Walkeshwar area of South Mumbai. On the death of B. K. Garudachar in February 2016 he became India's oldest first-class cricketer. He celebrated his 100th birthday in January 2020, attended by Steve Waugh, Sunil Gavaskar and Sachin Tendulkar. On 7 March 2020, he became the oldest living first-class cricketer following the death of John Manners. He died on 13 June 2020, aged 100, survived by his wife and their two daughters.

Books
 Ranji: The Legend and the Man (1963)
 Duleep: The Man and His Game (co-edited; 1963)
 Victor Trumper: The Beau Ideal of a Cricketer (edited; 1964)
 Ranji: A Centenary Album (edited; 1972) 
 L. P. Jai: Memories of a Great Batsman (edited; 1976)
 The Romance of the Ranji Trophy (1984)
 India's Hambledon Men (1986)
 CCI and the Brabourne Stadium, 1937-1987 (with Anandji Dossa; 1987)
 C. K. Nayudu: The Shahenshah of Indian Cricket (1989)
 Duleep: A Centenary Tribute (edited; 2005)
 From Presidency to Pentangular (with Mohandas Menon; 2006)
 Cricket Memories: Men and Matches of Bygone Days (2010)

See also
 Lists of oldest cricketers

References

External links
 
 Vasant Raiji CricketArchive page
 

1920 births
2020 deaths
Cricket historians and writers
Baroda cricketers
Mumbai cricketers
Indian cricketers
Indian centenarians
Men centenarians